The Deutsche Gesellschaft für Internationale Zusammenarbeit (GIZ) GmbH (English: German Agency for International Cooperation GmbH), often simply shortened to GIZ, is the main German development agency. It is headquartered in Bonn and Eschborn and provides services in the field of international development cooperation and international education work. The organization's self-declared goal is to deliver effective solutions that offer people better prospects and sustainably improve their living conditions.

GIZ's main commissioning party is Germany's Federal Ministry for Economic Cooperation and Development (BMZ). Other commissioners include European Union institutions, the United Nations, the private sector, and governments of other countries. In its projects GIZ works with partners in national governments, actors from the private sector, civil society and research institutions. Additionally, in cooperation with the German Federal Employment Agency, GIZ operates the Centre for International Migration and Development (CIM), an agency specialized on international cooperation activities related to global labor mobility. 

GIZ was established on 1 January 2011, through the merger of three German international development organizations: the Deutscher Entwicklungsdienst (DED), the Deutsche Gesellschaft für Technische Zusammenarbeit (GTZ), and Internationale Weiterbildung und Entwicklung (InWEnt). The merger was overseen by Dirk Niebel, federal development minister from 2009 to 2013. His predecessor had previously tried and failed to merge the DED with the KfW. GIZ is one of the world's largest development agencies, with a business volume in excess of €3.1 billion in 2019 as well as 22,199 employees spread over more than 120 countries.

Organisation 

GIZ's headquarters are located in Bonn and Eschborn. It also has an office in Berlin and at 16 other locations across Germany. Outside Germany, the company has a representation in Brussels and operates 90 offices around the world.

Because GIZ is incorporated under German law as a GmbH (limited liability company), it is governed by a management board that acts on behalf of the company's shareholders and is monitored by a supervisory board. Additionally, GIZ also has a board of trustees and a Private Sector Advisory Board. GIZ's management board consists of two managing directors, namely Thorsten Schäfer-Gümbel (Chairperson) and Ingrid-Gabriela Hoven.

Thorsten Schäfer-Gümbel, a former Social Democrat local politician, was previously one of three managing directors. Prior to him, the inaugural chairperson was Tanja Gönner, a former state-level minister of the Christian Democrats, who left politics during protests against the Stuttgart 21 train station project. She came to GIZ without prior experience in international development. She left GIZ in November 2022 to lead the German industry lobby BDI.

The Federal Republic of Germany (represented by the Federal Ministry for Economic Cooperation and Development (BMZ) and the Federal Ministry of Finance (BMF)) is GIZ's sole shareholder. The organization is structured into eight corporate units (Corporate Development; Corporate Communications; Legal Affairs and Insurance; Compliance and Integrity; Auditing; Evaluation; Corporate Security; Academy for International Cooperation (AIZ)) and ten departments (Commissioning Parties and Business Development; Sectoral Development; Sector and Global Programmes; Africa; Asia, Latin America, Caribbean; Europe, Mediterranean, Central Asia; International Services; Human Resources).

GIZ holds a 49% share in sequa gGmbH, the implementing partner of the German business community, in line with the company's objective to foster private sector development and cooperate closely with business chambers and associations abroad. Moreover, GIZ is a member of the European Network of Implementing Development Agencies (EUNIDA), which was co-founded by GTZ in 2000.

Activities 

GIZ's considers capacity development to be its core discipline. The company's services are grouped into eight so-called "product areas" (as of January 2017):

 Methods: 
 Advisory services: management of complex projects and programs (Capacity WORKS); development partnerships with the private sector; social impact assessment; 
 International competency development: e-learning, e-coaching, and e-collaboration; Leadership Development Workshop; key qualifications for international cooperation; strengthening training in partner countries (capacity to build capacity); training specialists and managers from partner organisations;
 Networking, dialogue and moderation: network management; alumni networks without borders; twinning (EU administration partnerships); stakeholder dialogues; competition management; knowledge sharing; 
 Management and logistics: grants; fund management; public procurement; knowledge-based services; evaluation; results-based monitoring; Systemic Quality Improvement (SQI);
 Rural Development:
 Agricultural policy and food: agricultural policy; rural development; land management; food and nutrition security/right to food;
 Agricultural trade, agricultural economy, standards: standards and food safety; agricultural trade; value chains; fisheries, aquaculture, and coastal zones; local and regional development;
 Agricultural production and resource use: sustainable use of natural resources and production systems in agriculture; agricultural research, innovations, education and extension; water and agriculture; climate change and agriculture; biological diversity;
 Sustainable Infrastructure:
 Water: in the field of water, sub-topics include sustainable sanitation and water supply, water policy, water resources management, water and the nexus between water and agriculture;
 Energy: basic energy supply services (rural electrification, solar lanterns, etc.), renewable energy; energy efficiency; international energy policy;
 Transport and infrastructure: transport policy and infrastructure management; sustainable urban mobility;
 Security, Reconstruction and Peace: 
 Emergency aid and disaster risk management: disaster risk management; food security in the context of conflicts and disasters; reconstruction for crisis prevention;
 Peace and security: security sector reform; crisis prevention and peacebuilding;
 Social development: 
 Health: health promotion; improving sexual and reproductive health; strengthening health systems; HIV and health;
 Education: quality education for a better future; training and capacity building for teachers;
 Social protection: social health protection; strategies to implement social justice;
 Governance and Democracy: 
 Democracy and the rule of law: democracy promotion; good governance, gender; corruption prevention; human rights; law and justice; promoting citizen involvement;
 Decentralization and urban development: decentralisation; urban and municipal development;
 Public finance and administration: Public finance reform; public administration; strengthening good governance in the extractive sector (e.g. EITI);
 Environment and climate change: 
 Climate change: climate change (implementation of the UN Framework Convention on Climate Change); integrated ozone and climate protection;
 Natural resource management: forest policy and sustainable forest management; combating desertification (e.g. based on the UN Convention to Combat Desertification); biological diversity (implementation of the UN Convention on Biological Diversity);
 Urban and industrial environmental management: waste and recycling management; resource efficient economy; sustainable tourism;
 Environmental policy: environmental policy; environmental finance; regional environmental cooperation; green economy;
 Economic development and employment: 
 Labor market and TVET: labour-market oriented TVET systems; skills development for secure livelihoods; promoting sustainable employment and employment policies (including occupational safety and health, labor rights, unionisation, etc.);
 Financial system development: microfinance; rural finance, financing agriculture and SMEs; insurance; financial sector stability and capital market development;
 Private sector: private sector development; supporting value chains; local and regional economic development; shaping migration;
 Economic policy: economic policy advice for sustainable economic development; trade; quality infrastructure and consumer protection; green economy; regional economic integration;

GIZ has been involved in the creation of various networks, associations and portals, and may carry out or support secretariat functions for some of these for a limited period of time. Examples of such networks and associations that have had some GIZ involvement include:
 Renewable Energy Policy Network for the 21st Century (REN21)
 BIOPAT
 Alumniportal Germany
 Sustainable Sanitation Alliance
Other global agendas supported by GIZ include South-South cooperation, i.e. bilateral cooperation between developing countries and emerging economies, and triangular cooperation between developing countries as beneficiaries, emerging economies as "new donors" and traditional donors, e.g. Germany, as contributors of expertise.

GIZ works closely with the German government-owned development bank KfW, which is based in Frankfurt. While GIZ implements those projects on behalf of the BMZ that belong to "technical cooperation", i.e. capacity development, the KfW implements those BMZ projects belonging to "financial cooperation".

GIZ is currently represented in the SuRe® Stakeholder Council. SuRe® – The Standard for Sustainable and Resilient Infrastructure is a global voluntary standard which integrates key criteria of sustainability and resilience into infrastructure development and upgrade. SuRe® is developed by GIB Foundation and Natixis as part of a multi-stakeholder process and will be compliant with ISEAL guidelines.

Finally, GIZ also hosts the Eschborn Dialogue, a two-day event for international experts on a given topic in international cooperation (e.g. "World in motion: mobility, migration, digital change" in 2014 or "Raw materials and resources: growth, values, competition" in 2013). The Eschborn Dialogue has been organized each year since 1988.

Controversy 
In 2021, German troops ended their presence in Afghanistan. Since then, the Taliban have taken over the country and persecuted former staff of foreign states, including former local staff of Germany. This led Germany to allow some local staff to immigrate. However, GIZ continued hiring new local staff in Afghanistan, and was criticised for this in 2022.

Commissioning Parties 

GIZ mainly operates on behalf of the Federal Ministry for Economic Cooperation and Development (BMZ). At the national level, GIZ, however, is also commissioned by other government departments, e.g. the Federal Foreign Office, the Federal Ministry for the Environment (BMU), or the Federal Ministry for Economic Affairs and Energy (BMWi), as well as by German states and municipalities. At the international level, GIZ cooperates with the European Union, UN agencies, other international institutions such as the Global Fund to Fight AIDS, Tuberculosis and Malaria (GFFATM), and foreign governments. The cooperation with private enterprises is an emerging field, promoted under the name of sustainable development. The GIZ is set up with International Services (IS) and the Public Private Partnership (PPP) in this area.

Staff 
In 2012, the GIZ employed 23,614 staff members in ca. 120 countries. Close to 70 percent are local forces that are complemented by development aid workers as well as experts from the Centrum für internationale Migration und Entwicklung that helps to integrate employees into the workforce in developing countries. The majority (80%) of employees is working outside of Germany.

The GIZ operates in a variety of countries with different security situations. Staff of the GIZ is exposed to the particular security situation of the country they work in and have therefore been exposed to violence in the past including abduction as well as other violent acts (e.g. abduction in Afghanistan in 2015 or fatal assault in Niger in 2018).

See also 
 List of development aid agencies
 Local Government ICT Network (South Africa)

References

External links 

 

International management consulting firms
Management consulting firms of Germany
Appropriate technology organizations
Organisations based in Bonn
Foreign charities operating in Cambodia
Organizations established in 2011
Second Merkel cabinet